Pseudobombax longiflorum is a species of flowering plants of the family Malvaceae. It is found in Bolivia and Brazil.

References

External links
 

longiflorum
Plants described in 1963
Flora of Bolivia
Flora of Brazil